VA-95 has the following meanings:
VA-95 (U.S. Navy), an attack squadron in service from 1943 to 1949
Second VA-95 (U.S. Navy), an attack squadron in service from 1952 to 1970
Third VA-95 (U.S. Navy), an attack squadron in service from 1972 to 1995
Virginia State Route 95 (disambiguation)